Håkan Gustaf Nilsson (born 23 May 1997) is a Swedish professional footballer who plays as a forward for Belgian First Division A club Union SG.

Club career
Signed on 22 January 2016 a four-year pre-contract with the Danish team Brøndby IF starting from the summer of 2016. Since 5 January 2021 Nilsson plays for SV Wehen Wiesbaden in the German 3. Liga.

On 28 July 2022, Nilsson signed a three-year contract with Union SG in Belgium.

International career
He made his debut for Sweden national football team on 7 January 2018 in a friendly game against Estonia. On 11 January 2018, he scored in the 90th minute to give his country a 1–0 victory in a friendly against Denmark.

Career statistics

International

 Scores and results list Sweden's goal tally first, score column indicates score after each Nilsson goal.

References

External links

1997 births
Living people
Swedish footballers
Association football forwards
Falkenbergs FF players
Brøndby IF players
Silkeborg IF players
Vejle Boldklub players
BK Häcken players
SV Wehen Wiesbaden players
Royale Union Saint-Gilloise players
Allsvenskan players
Danish Superliga players
3. Liga players
Belgian Pro League players
Sweden youth international footballers
Sweden under-21 international footballers
Sweden international footballers
Swedish expatriate footballers
Swedish expatriate sportspeople in Denmark
Swedish expatriate sportspeople in Germany
Swedish expatriate sportspeople in Belgium
Expatriate men's footballers in Denmark
Expatriate footballers in Germany
Expatriate footballers in Belgium